Myopia are an American power metal band from Connecticut assembled in 2004. In 2007, they released their first full-length album, "Nyght" under independent auspices.  The album was recorded in Horizon Studios of West Haven, CT and mastered by Mika Jussila of Finnvox Studios, famous for mastering artists such as Nightwish, Sonata Arctica, and Children of Bodom.

The band has toured throughout the Northeastern United States and opened for national touring acts, including Sonata Arctica, Symphony X, Stratovarius, Edguy, Into Eternity, and Black Label Society. 

They have most recently released their second full-length album, Silvers for the Never, on July 23, 2011.

As of November 13, 2011, they have officially dissolved, making the announcement via their Facebook page.

Discography 
The Rising EP, 2005
The Straightway Full-length, 2006
Nyght Full-length, 2007
Silvers For the Never, 2011

Line-up
Mark Grey - Lead vocals
Charles Woodruff - Guitar
Michael Cavadini - Keyboards
Kyle Longley - Bass & vocals
William Woodruff - Drums

References

External links
 
 Myopia on Myspace
 Myopia on Myspace (in Italy)
 Live review at Ultimatemetal.com
 Myopia featured in the New Haven Advocate
 Myopia profile in "Encyclopaedia Metallum"
 Myopia review (in Dutch)
 Myopia on MTVU

Heavy metal musical groups from Connecticut
American power metal musical groups
Musical groups established in 2004
Musical quintets